
Gmina Gołdap is an urban-rural gmina (administrative district) in Gołdap County, Warmian-Masurian Voivodeship, in northern Poland, on the border with Russia.

The gmina contains part of the protected area called Puszcza Romincka Landscape Park.

Villages
Apart from the town of Gołdap, Gmina Gołdap contains the villages and settlements of Babki, Bałupiany, Barkowo, Bitkowo, Błażejewo, Boćwinka, Boćwiński Młyn, Botkuny, Bronisze, Czarnowo Wielkie, Dąbie, Dunajek, Dunajek Mały, Dzięgiele, Galwiecie, Gieraliszki, Główka, Górne, Grabowo, Grygieliszki, Jabłońskie, Jabramowo, Janki, Janowo, Jany, Jeziorki Małe, Jeziorki Wielkie, Juchnajcie, Jurkiszki, Kalkowo, Kalniszki, Kamionki, Kolniszki, Konikowo, Kośmidry, Kowalki, Kozaki, Łobody, Marcinowo, Mażucie, Nasuty, Niedrzwica, Nowa Boćwinka, Okrasin, Osieki, Osowo, Piękne Łąki, Pietrasze, Pietraszki, Pogorzel, Regiele, Rostek, Rożyńsk Mały, Rożyńsk Wielki, Rudzie, Samoniny, Siedlisko, Skocze, Sokoły, Suczki, Szyliny, Tatary, Użbale, Wiłkajcie, Wilkasy, Włosty, Wronki Wielkie, Wrotkowo, Zatyki, Żelazki and Zielonka.

Neighbouring gminas
Gmina Gołdap is bordered by the gminas of Banie Mazurskie, Dubeninki, Filipów and Kowale Oleckie. It also borders Russia (Kaliningrad oblast).

References
Polish official population figures 2006

Goldap
Gołdap County